The South Pacific Division (SPD) of Seventh-day Adventists is a sub-entity of the General Conference of Seventh-day Adventists, which oversees the Church's work in the South Pacific nations of Australia, New Zealand, Papua New Guinea and the islands of the South Pacific. Its headquarters is in Wahroonga, Sydney, Australia.

The division is made up of four regional offices: these are the Australian Union Conference (headquarters in Melbourne), New Zealand Pacific Union Conference (headquarters in Auckland), Papua New Guinea Union Mission (headquarters in Lae) and Trans-Pacific Union Mission (headquarters in Suva, Fiji). The Division membership as of June 30, 2021 is 610,109.

Sub Fields
The South Pacific Division is divided into two Union Conferences and two Union Missions. These are divided into local Conferences, Fields, Regions and Field Stations.

Australian Union Conference 
Greater Sydney Conference
North New South Wales Conference
Northern Australian Conference
South Australian Conference
South New South Wales Conference
South Queensland Conference
Tasmanian Conference
Victorian Conference
Western Australian Conference
New Zealand Pacific Union Conference
Cook Islands Mission
French Polynesia Mission
New Caledonia Mission
Pitcairn Field Station
North New Zealand Conference
South New Zealand Conference
Papua New Guinea Union Mission
Bougainville Mission
Central Papua Conference
Eastern Highlands Simbu Mission
Madang Manus Mission
Morobe Mission
New Britain New Ireland Mission
Northern and Milne Bay Mission
Sepik Mission
South West Papua Mission
Western Highlands Mission
Trans Pacific Union Mission
American Samoa Mission
Fiji Mission
Kiribati Mission
Niue Field Station
Samoas-Tokelau Mission
Solomon Islands Mission
Tonga Mission
Tuvalu Region
Vanuatu Mission

References

External links 
 

History of the Seventh-day Adventist Church
Seventh-day Adventist Church in Oceania